The Hermann Oberth Space Travel Museum (Hermann-Oberth-Raumfahrt-Museum, or Hermann-Oberth-Museum for short) is a museum of space technology in the Franconian city of Feucht in Bavaria, Germany.

It commemorates the life work of the famous visionary and rocket pioneer Hermann Oberth.  Exhibits include a Kumulus rocket and a Cirrus rocket, which were developed at the beginning of the 1960s by the Hermann Oberth Society and launched near Cuxhaven, Germany. A Swiss Zenit sounding rocket is also on display in front of the museum.

The long-time chair person of the museum, Karl-Heinz Rohrwild, served together with Oberth's daughter as expert and interview partner on early rocket and spaceflight technology for the documentary "Das RAK-Protokoll" on Opel RAK, the world's first rocket program, and Oberth's influence on key Opel RAK people like his student Max Valier and Fritz von Opel.

References

External links

Hermann-Oberth-Raumfahrt-Museum home page

Museums in Bavaria
Rocketry
Aerospace museums in Germany
Science museums in Germany
Nürnberger Land